Hong Yan may refer to:

Yan Hong (disambiguation), Chinese people with the surname Yan
Hongyan (disambiguation)